The 121st New York State Legislature, consisting of the New York State Senate and the New York State Assembly, met from January 5 to July 16, 1898, during the second year of Frank S. Black's governorship, in Albany.

Background
Under the provisions of the New York Constitution of 1894, 50 Senators and 150 assemblymen were elected in single-seat districts; senators for a two-year term, assemblymen for a one-year term. The senatorial districts were made up of entire counties, except New York County (twelve districts), Kings County (seven districts), Erie County (three districts) and Monroe County (two districts). The Assembly districts were made up of contiguous area, all within the same county.

At the New York state election, 1895, the state officers and state senators were elected to an exceptional three-year term (for the sessions of 1896, 1897 and 1898), so that the election of these officers would be held, beginning in 1898, in even-numbered years, at the same time as the gubernatorial election.

At this time there were two major political parties: the Republican Party and the Democratic Party. The Socialist Labor Party and the Prohibition Party also nominated tickets.

Elections
The New York state election, 1897 was held on November 2. The only statewide elective office up for election was carried by Democrat Alton B. Parker. The approximate party strength at this election, as expressed by the vote for Chief Judge of the Court of Appeals, was: Democratic 555,000; Republican 494,000; Socialist Labor 21,000; and Prohibition 20,000.

Sessions
The Legislature met for the regular session at the State Capitol in Albany on January 5, 1898; and adjourned on March 31.

James M. E. O'Grady (R) was re-elected Speaker, against Thomas F. Donnelly (D).

On April 25, Congress declared that the Spanish–American War had begun four days previously. Many New Yorkers volunteered to fight for the independence of Cuba, among them Assistant U.S. Secretary of the Navy Theodore Roosevelt and Assemblyman William A. Chanler.

The Legislature met for a special session on July 11; and adjourned on July 16. The Legislature enacted a Metropolitan District Elections law which took the organization of elections in New York City out of the hands of the metropolitan police force, then headed by Chief William Stephen Devery, and placed them instead in the hands of a State Superintendent of Elections, appointed by the Governor, and confirmed by the Senate. A few minutes after the law was passed, John McCullagh, Devery's predecessor as head of the metropolitan police, was appointed to the office. The Legislature also appropriated money to an additional war fund; and enacted a Soldiers Vote law, expecting it being necessary to take the vote of the New Yorkers engaged in the Spanish–American War in the field during the next state election.

State Senate

Districts

Note: In 1897, New York County (the boroughs of Manhattan and Bronx), Kings County (the borough of Brooklyn), Richmond County (the borough of Staten Island) and the Western part of Queens County (the borough of Queens) were consolidated into the present-day City of New York. The Eastern part of Queens County (the non-consolidated part) was separated in 1899 as Nassau County. Parts of the 1st and 2nd Assembly districts of Westchester County were annexed by New York City in 1895, and became part of the Borough of the Bronx in 1898.

Members
The asterisk (*) denotes members of the previous Legislature who continued in office as members of this Legislature.

Employees
 Clerk: James S. Whipple
 Sergeant-at-Arms: Garret J. Benson
 Doorkeeper: Nathan Lewis
 Stenographer: Edward Shaughnessy

State Assembly

Assemblymen

Employees
 Clerk: Archie E. Baxter
 Assistant Clerk: Ray B. Smith
 Sergeant-at-Arms: James C. Crawford

Notes

Sources
 The New York Red Book compiled by Edgar L. Murlin (published by James B. Lyon, Albany NY, 1897; see pg. 133–177 for senators' bios; between pg. 136 and 137 for senators' portraits; pg. 404 for list of senators; and pg. 712–716 for senate districts)
 Official New York from Cleveland to Hughes by Charles Elliott Fitch (Hurd Publishing Co., New York and Buffalo, 1911, Vol. IV; see pg. 338f for assemblymen; and 364 for senators)
 Public Service by James S. Barcus (The Globe Publishing Co., New York, 1898; see pg. 164 for senators; 165–168 for assemblymen; 168 for senate employees; and 169 for assembly employees; has also maps of senate and assembly districts)
 THE DEMOCRATIC CAUCUS in NYT on January 5, 1898

121
1898 in New York (state)
1898 U.S. legislative sessions